Déjà mort is a 1998 French drama film directed by Olivier Dahan. It stars Romain Duris and Benoît Magimel.

Cast
 Romain Duris as Romain
 Benoît Magimel as David
 Zoé Félix as Laure
 Clément Sibony as Andrea
 Isaac Sharry as Alain
 Philippe Martinez

References

External links

1998 films
Films directed by Olivier Dahan
Films about pornography
French crime drama films
1998 crime drama films
Films scored by Bruno Coulais
1990s French-language films
1990s French films